This gallery shows the results of numerous image scaling algorithms.

Scaling methods 

An image size can be changed in several ways. Consider resizing a 160x160 pixel photo to the following 40x40 pixel thumbnail and then scaling the thumbnail to a 160x160 pixel image. Also consider doubling the size of the following image containing text.

References 

Image processing
Image galleries
Image scaling algorithms